Eviota mikiae, commonly called Miki's pygmy-goby or white-line eviota among various other vernacular names, is a species of marine fish in the family Gobiidae.

Etymology
The fish is named in honor of Miki Tonozuka of Bali, Indonesia, for her assistance in the field during the Weh Island survey, during which the type specimen was collected.

Distribution
The Miki's pygmy-goby is widespread throughout the tropical waters of the Indian Ocean.

Size
This pygmy goby is a small sized fish. It can grow up to a size of  length.

References

Taxa named by Gerald R. Allen
Fish described in 2001
mikiae